Guang Chengzi (Literarily "Person Who Knows All" ) is a Taoist deity and a character in the classic Chinese novel Fengshen Yanyi.

Taoist mythology 
From the idea of Taoism, Guang Chengzi was the avatar of Taishang Laojun (also named Daode Tianzun) during the period of Yellow Emperor in ancient Chinese history. According to Zhuangzi's recording, he lived in Kongtong Mountains, the Yellow Emperor visited him there for his teaching. He gave the Yellow Emperor several books that talked about the moral, natural, and philosophical issues, which helped the Yellow Emperor create the early Chinese civilization. It is said that Guang Chengzi had a long life of 1200 years. There is another saying that Guang Chengzi was the avatar of the Dao, who appeared in the human world three times – the first time as Guang Chengzi during the Yellow Emperor time; second as Laozi during the Spring and Autumn period; and third time as Zhang Daoling in the Han Dynasty.

In Fengshen Yanyi 
From the novel of Fengshen Yanyi, Guang Chengzi is the student of Yuanshi Tianzun, who is the co-founder of Branch Chan of Taoism. Guangchengzi ranked the first of the Twelve Golden Xian (十二金仙) along with Yuanshi Tianzun's other eleven students: Chi Jingzi, Yuding Zhenren, Taiyi Zhenren, Huanglong Zhenren, Wenshu Guangfa Tianzun (also known as Manjusri), Puxian Zhenren (also known as Samantabhadra), Cihang Zhenren (also known as Guanyin), Lingbao Dafashi, Ju Liusun (also known as Kakusandha Buddha), Daoxing Tianzun, and Qingxu Daode Tianzun. The twelve Xians and their students worked together with Jiang Ziya to support King Wu of Zhou conquer King Zhou of Shang (who got the support of the Branch Jie). 

On his visit to Jin'ao Island to see Tongtian Jiaozhu--the founder of Branch Jie, he killed Tongtian Jiaozhu's student Jinling Shengmu by mistake, which angered the other people from Branch Jie. He was able to leave the island after that, but the direct war between Branch Jie and Branch Chan began. That huge war lasted for a long time and many gods and Xians were injured or even killed in the war. Eventually Branch Chan beat Branch Jie.

Weapons of Guangchengzi 
He has three weapons: Fantian Yin, Luohun Bell, and Female-Male Double Sword.
Fantian Yin is his best weapon. It is said to be a huge seal, which was made by Guangchengzi's teacher Yuanshi Tianzun and then passed to him. Fantian Yin is driven by magic; it kills people by hitting the forehead. Luohun Bell was a bell that makes the sound to interrupt enemies' soul. Female-Male Double Sword was a pair of swords; these swords were believed to have genders, one was female and one was male, and he was considered the master of Chinese sword culture.

Guangchengzi's student 

He had sacrificed many years of solitude and had emerged as an immortal. Originally, this superior man had been within the Peach Stream Cave of Mount Nine Elves. After he, along with his fellow immortal by the name of Chijingzi had been passing by King Zhou's capital, Zhaoge, two very large beams of red light from heaven had impeded Guang Chengzi's path. After Guangchengzi personally saw beneath him the unfortunate events taking place - the near execution of both the crown princes Yin Jiao and Yin Hong - Guang Chengzi would say that it would be best to create a very large tornado over the capital and use the confusion to steal both of the princes – as to ensure the creation of the new dynasty. Guangchengzi took Yin Jiao as his student, and Chijingzi took Yin Hong as student.

After several decades of studying, Yin Hong was strong enough to do some contributions to the world, thus Guang Chengzi gave him the Fantian Yin along with some other weapons and asked Yin Jiao to help Jiang Ziya and King Wu of Zhou. However, on Yin Jiao's way to the camp of King Wu's army, he met a bad person called Shen Gongbao, who persuaded Yin Jiao to help his father King Zhou to fight against King Wu, and protect the country of Shang. As a youth who had little social experience, Yin Jiao accepted Shen Gong Bao's suggestion and fought against King Wu's army, contrary to his teacher Guang Chengzi. Eventually, he killed Yin Jiao.

References
 Investiture of the Gods chapter 9 pages 107-108

Chinese gods
Investiture of the Gods characters
Deities in Taoism